Violence Violence is the debut full-length album from American hardcore punk band Ceremony. The vinyl release of the album contains the original 13 song track list, while the CD version includes the band's previous effort, 2005's Ruined EP.

While officially a full-length album, Violence Violence offers 13 songs in just over 13 minutes, with many tracks consisting of short, chaotic bursts of energy that last mere seconds. The Deathwish Inc. released vinyl edition plays the album in its entirety twice, once on each side of the LP. Guitarist Anthony Anzaldo has said that he was influenced by the music of punk bands Pg. 99 and Tragedy while writing music for the album.

Reception

As Ceremony's first full-length release, Violence Violence was met with wide acclaim from hardcore punk enthusiasts. Punknews.org named the record "a modern hardcore masterpiece", while Sputnikmusic commented that the album was aptly named, calling it "violence in audio form". Critics and fans praised the raw energy on the record, the band's dynamism, and the songs' abilities to generate physically impassioned performances.

Track listing

The CD release of the album includes their debut EP release, Ruined, as seven bonus tracks.

Personnel
Ross Farrar – vocals
Anthony Anzaldo – guitars
Ryan Mattos – guitars
Justin Davis – bass
Jake Cazarotti – drums

Technical personnel
Zack Ohren – producer
Linas Garsys – artwork

References

External links 
 

2006 albums
Deathwish Inc. albums
Powerviolence albums
Ceremony (punk band) albums